Austin Irving (born 1984) is an American contemporary artist and photographer.

Life 
Irving was born in New York City in 1984. She is the daughter of film director David Irving and landscape designer Susan Irving. Her paternal grandparents are theater director Jules Irving and the actor Priscilla Pointer. She is the niece of the actor Amy Irving. In 2006, Irving graduated from the Tisch School Of The Arts at NYU with a BFA from the Department of Photography and Imaging.  In 2017, she was the artist-in-residence at the National Centre for Biological Sciences in Bangalore, India.  In 2019, she was an artist-in-residence at the Varda Artist Residency aboard the SS Vallejo, a historic house boat in Sausalito, California.

Career 
Irving works with large format analog photography. She uses a Toyo view camera and shoots on 4x5 Kodak color negative. Her images are presented as large scale photographic prints. Her photographs explore liminality and metageography, anthropocentrism, and the tension between natural and man-made environments. Irving has stated that her photographic practice is motivated by the wish to find relief from the "extreme internal discomfort" of living with body dysmorphic disorder. Irving cites Thomas Demand, Bernd & Hilla Becher, MC Escher, René Magritte, Lynne Cohen, and James Turrell as artists whose work have impacted her practice.

She has been working on a photographic series entitled NOT AN EXIT (2007–present), which showcases real-world optical illusions created from narrow angles in functional hallways and doorways. These photographs have been called Escher-esque, a reference to M. C. Escher.  The debut of this series at Wilding Cran Gallery was reviewed in The LA Times by art critic Leah Ollman.

Her series SHOW CAVES (2009–present) has received significant media and academic interest for its interrogation of the ethics and impact of ecotourism, specifically the concept of government and commercially operated show caves. As a result, Irving was asked to sit on a panel for a public forum on rural economies at Virginia Tech's annual conference for Appalachian Studies Association, where the socio-economic impact of commodifying rural arts, culture, environment, and heritage to create a tourist industry in rural Appalachia was debated. This series has also been featured on The Weather Channel, Yatzer, and in Wired Magazine. An image from this series won the Florida Museum of Photographic Art’s 2021 International Photography Competition.

In 2017, Irving's photographs from her NOT AN EXIT series were included in the exhibition Reimagining A Safe Space at NYU. The exhibition explored the notion of safe spaces, especially examples of and challenges to the concept. This series showcased real-world optical illusions created from narrow angles in functional hallways and doorways.  Within the exhibition, the series was credited with providing context for the contested topic of safe spaces. In 2019, two works from NOT AN EXIT were also included in the third Every Woman Biennial in New York City curated by C. Finley, an answer to the Whitney Biennial which showcases diversity among contemporary female and queer artists.

Exhibitions 
Upon graduating from NYU, Irving was selected to be a part of the SoHo Photo Gallery’s 12th Annual National Photo Competition in 2007 in lower Manhattan. In 2012, Irving created a visual essay of her SHOW CAVES series that was projected at The Pavilion during LOOK3’s sixth annual Festival of the Photograph in Charlottesville, Virginia. LOOK3 was founded in 2006 by National Geographic photographer Michael Nichols and has been billed as "3 days of peace, love, and photography.” In 2013 and 2014, Irving’s work was included in the international shows After Dark I and After Dark II, respectively, at Greg Moon Gallery in Taos, New Mexico. In 2015, NOT AN EXIT was featured in The Interiors Collection by SeeMe and was shown at the fifth Annual Exposure Awards at Musé du Louvre, Paris.

In 2016, Irving's photographs from her NOT AN EXIT series were included in the exhibition Hong Kong: Identity + Illusion at  LightStage Gallery, Hong Kong. This exhibition was a "photo and interactive performance art exhibition of Hong Kong-based artists exploring individual narratives of personal identity, 'self' across time and space and cities on this incessant journey to somewhere both routine and new, and illusions of light and being as told through a camera's lens, as captured if for an instant."

In 2017, Irving's photographs from her NOT AN EXIT series were included in the exhibition Reimagining A Safe Space at NYU. The exhibition explored the notion of safe spaces, especially examples of and challenges to the concept. This series showcased real-world optical illusions created from narrow angles in functional hallways and doorways.  Within the exhibition, the series was credited with providing context for the contested topic of safe spaces.

In 2019, two works from NOT AN EXIT were also included in the third Every Woman Biennial in New York City curated by C. Finley, an answer to the Whitney Biennial which showcases diversity among contemporary female and queer artists. Work from Irving’s CORNERED series was included in The Edge Effect, an International Juried Exhibition at New York's Katonah Museum of Art juried by Akili Tommasino, Associate Curator, Modern and Contemporary Art, Museum of Fine Arts, Boston.

In 2020 Irving was a part of the person show entitled A Curious Horizon at The Irvine Fine Arts Center in Southern California that “explore our perceptions of, and relationships to the world and our sense of place within it. Uncanny doorways, artificially encased exotic flora, and pastel-hued images of empty suburban spaces converge to evoke subtle and powerful statements on the precarious nature of the environments we’ve built and reshaped.”

In 2021, Irving’s work was featured in the 44th year of NIDA Meting Photography International Photography Symposium New Boarders, in Nida, Lithuania on located on the Curonian Spit on the Baltic Sea.

In 2022, Irving won the 2022 Aesthetica Art Prize and work from her NOT AN EXIT series was featured in their new anthology: Future Now 2022

Awards and nominations 
In 2014, an image from her SHOW CAVES series won the jury award at  Gallery 110’s 4th annual juried exhibition in Seattle, Washington. In 2015 her photo series SHOW CAVES was a finalist in both the Architecture and Landscape categories for the  Felix Schoeller Photo Award in Osnabrück, Germany. In 2016, she was a nominee for the United States Artists Fellowship. In 2019, her project NOT AN EXIT was awarded a gold medal at the Prix de la Photographie Paris in the Fine Arts/Architecture category while her project PLANTS IN EXILE was awarded gold in the Nature/Trees category.  In 2019, an image from the same series was awarded third place in an international photography competition held by the New York Center for Photographic Arts. In 2019, Irving also won 1st place in the landscape category at the International Photography Grant. In 2020, her projects SHOW CAVES and NOT AN EXIT won first place at The Budapest International Foto Awards in the Science and Architecture categories. In 2021 Irving was a Chosen Winner of American Photography 37, American Illustration and American Photography (AI-AP), SHOW CAVES won best in show and PLANTS IN EXILE won 2nd place at the Florida Museum of Photographic Arts (FMoPA) 2021 International Photography Competition. In 2022, NOT AN EXIT won the 2022 Aesthetica Art Prize.

References

External links 
"Meet An Artist Mondays - Austin Irving" LA Weekly, Shana Nys Dambrot, August 17, 2020
 "Portrait of Catherine Opie" TimeOut New York, January 14, 2016

"Austin Irving: The Optical Illusions That Might Lurk Around Every Corner" The Plus, June 2015

"Austin Irving at Wilding Cran" Artillery, Annabel Osberg, June 25, 2015

"Austin Irving" Ain't Bad Magazine, October 13, 2014

"Show Caves by Austin Irving" The Morning News, February 26, 2013
 "Austin Irving's Show Caves Flaunt It" The Stranger, Jen Graves, February 18, 2014

"Show Caves by Austin Irving" Purple, February 1, 2013
 "Austin Irving" Fine Line Magazine, June 22, 2012
 "Austin Irving" Artsy
 "Austin Irving" ND Magazine

1984 births
Living people
Tisch School of the Arts alumni
American women photographers
American contemporary artists
Artists from New York City
American photographers